Oberthueria lunwan is a moth in the Endromidae family. It is found in China (Yunnan) and north-eastern Myanmar.

Adults have a dark yellow ground colour, with a distinct postmedian on the forewings. Adults are on wing in May and June.

References

Moths described in 2013
Oberthueria (moth)